Bruce Hopkins (6 December 1924 – 26 December 2013) was an Australian rugby league footballer who played in the 1940s. He played for the Canterbury Bulldogs for three seasons between 1947–1949, the Balmain Tigers for two seasons between 1950–1951, the St. George Dragons for one season in 1954.

Hopkins represented New South Wales in 1947 and 1948 and for the Australian national side in 1948. He attended Sydney Boys High School, graduating in 1942. While serving in the Australian Army in Townsville, he played for Centrals ASA rugby league club during 1945 and 1946. Hopkins played for Canterbury-Bankstown at halfback in the 1947 NSWRFL season's grand final, losing to Balmain. The following year he was first selected to play for Australia, but did not appear in any Test matches. He is remembered as the first ever Canterbury-Bankstown player to be selected for a Kangaroo Tour.

References

1924 births
2013 deaths
Sportsmen from New South Wales
Rugby league players from Sydney
Balmain Tigers players
St. George Dragons players
Canterbury-Bankstown Bulldogs players
New South Wales rugby league team players
People educated at Sydney Boys High School
Australia national rugby league team players
Rugby league halfbacks